Kaaranji is 2009 Kannada language film directed by debutante director Shreedhar. 
This is a story of five youngsters who are passionate about music.
It's the story of a band troupe, headed by Viji (Vijaya Raghavendra), which struggles to grow as it faces one problem after the other. First, it faces embarrassment in a hotel when the band members sing a Kannada number. Then there is rift among the members when Viji gets to know Vasumathi (Gauri Karnik). The troupe also faces the problem of finding a female singer for 'Music Challenge 2008' contest. But it comes out of all the problems and wins laurels. The music of the film was composed by Veer Samarth.

Cast
It stars Vijaya Raghavendra and Bollywood actress Gauri Karnik.

 Vijaya Raghavendra
 Gauri Karnik
 Chandra Shekhar('Edagallu Guddadamele'movie fame) 
 Sudha Belawadi
 Arvind Shreedhar
 Nanjunda
 Raj
 Chetan
 Chandan

Music
The score for this film by Veera Samarth, a promising newcomer in Kannada film Industry. Film has 14 tracks based on works of popular writers like Santha Shishunala Sharif, T. P. Kailasam, N.K. Hanumanthaiah, Dr. H.S. Venkateshamurthy, Chi. Udaya Shankar, Satish Tiptur, Raghavendra Kamath, Sridhar and S.S. Kulkarni.

References

External links
 
 www.OneIndia.in
 www.indiaglitz.com

2000s Kannada-language films
2009 films